Bullish is a 1984 album released by Herb Alpert and the Tijuana Brass, though the Tijuana Brass was not involved in its making. The album was reissued in 2017. The music of the album is mostly electro-funk, with Alpert's characteristic trumpet in accompaniment.  The album is mostly instrumental, though Lani Hall provides vocals on the track "Maniac". Describing the album in 1984, Alpert said, "I don't think of this as a backward-looking record ... It's very contemporary."

Reception 
"Bullish" had limited success on the charts and somewhat favorable reviews. Writing for The Washington Post, Mike Joyce described the album as a mixture of the sounds of the older Tijuana Brass and the newer dance hits of the 1970s. He noted, "The ballad 'Always Have a Dream' ... is equipped with the sort of lilting melody that Alpert's tart trumpet always accommodated handsomely back then, [and] 'Passion Play' is another reminder of those Latin rhythms." But, he added, "Many of the tracks on 'Bullish' seem more inspired by the dance hits Alpert had in the disco era." In the same review, the track "Maniac" was poorly received, as "a rather odd choice for a Brass reunion; nor can singer Lani Hall keep the tune from sounding dated and miscast".

The album peaked at #28 on the Billboard Jazz Albums chart, in October 1984. The "Bullish" single peaked at #75 on the Billboard 200 chart in September 1984.

Track listing
 Bullish
 Always Have a Dream (Pour Le Coeur, A Mon Pere)
 Make a Wish
 Maniac
 Struttin' on Five
 Love without Words
 Passion Play
 Life Is My Song

References

Additional sources
 

Herb Alpert albums
1984 albums
A&M Records albums